Takoma, Washington, D.C., is a neighborhood in Washington, D.C. It is located in Advisory Neighborhood Commission 4B, in the District's Fourth Ward, within the northwest quadrant. It borders the city of Takoma Park, Maryland.

Overview

Takoma is a diverse neighborhood, populated mostly by middle-class families. Its small downtown has recently been redeveloped, bringing in new residents and attractive new businesses. Many of the houses in Takoma are historic, and some are over 100 years old.

Takoma and the rest of Ward 4 are represented in the Council of the District of Columbia by Janeese Lewis George.

Geography

Along Eastern Avenue, Takoma borders Takoma Park, Maryland, a city with which Takoma shares its origins. Takoma shares a common identity with the neighboring city in Maryland, and the downtown area surrounding the Takoma Metro station crosses the District of Columbia line.  
   
Takoma is bounded by Georgia Avenue to the west, somewhere between Tuckerman and Van Buren Streets to the south, and Eastern Avenue to the northeast. The former site of the Walter Reed Army Medical Center on Georgia Avenue separates it from Rock Creek Park. However, the neighborhood historically and culturally spans across the Maryland line into the greater neighborhood of Takoma Park.

History

Takoma, which was originally named Takoma Park, was developed in 1883 by developer Benjamin Franklin Gilbert as a commuter suburb on the Metropolitan Branch of the Baltimore and Ohio railroad line. Gilbert welcomed the Seventh-day Adventist Church to set up their world headquarters and publishing house in Takoma Park, D.C. with a hospital and college in neighboring Takoma Park, Maryland, and promoted the community's reputation for vegetarianism and "clean living" away from the "malarial swamps" of the city. Takoma, D.C. was originally regarded as the commercial hub for the entire surrounding area, prior to the development of Silver Spring, Maryland, as it featured large shops and industrial buildings in the area now occupied by the Metro station. Its commercial hub is considered to be part of Takoma Park's Historic District.

Takoma was originally the name of Mount Rainier, from Lushootseed  (earlier ), "snow-covered mountain". Gilbert wished to rename the train stop called Brightwood, and the name Takoma was chosen in 1883 by D.C. resident Ida Summy, who believed it to mean "high up" or "near heaven".

The Seventh-day Adventist Church maintained its world headquarters and a publishing house on the Eastern Avenue side of the D.C. line until the early 1980s; after moving to Silver Spring, the former site of the publishing house became art lofts and rehearsal space for the Washington Opera.

The Takoma Theater, built in 1924, is located in the neighborhood and is supported by the Takoma Theatre Conservancy, a nonprofit preservation group that raised money to buy and refurbish the theater.

The Takoma Masonic Center's ground-breaking ceremony took place on November 12, 1924, at the corner of Carroll Street NW and Maple Street NW. On November 29, 1924, the masonic cornerstone ceremony was conducted by the Grand Master of Masons of the District of Columbia, Charles F. Roberts, and Grand Lodge officers and members of the Grand Lodge of the District of Columbia, Free And Accepted Masons. Hiram-Takoma Lodge No. 10 and Takoma Chapter No. 12, Order of the Eastern Star of the District of Columbia, have met there since May 27, 1925.

Both Takoma Park, D.C., and Takoma Park, Maryland, have been noted, regionally and nationally, for progressive politics dating from the 1960s, when area residents (led by future Takoma Park, Maryland mayor Sam Abbott) rallied to prevent a 10-lane freeway from bisecting the community, and lobbied to build the Metrorail system, near the site of the former B&O railroad station around which the community had been built. However, much of the land adjacent to the station was demolished or neglected in the wake of the freeway controversy, creating division between downtown Takoma Park, Maryland, and the center of the Takoma community, which roughly parallels the D.C. line. Both of the remaining areas, on either side of the D.C.-Maryland line, are now protected as U.S. Historic Districts.

Education
District of Columbia Public Schools operates public schools. Takoma Education Campus and Coolidge High School are located in Takoma, D.C.

District of Columbia Public Library operates the Takoma Park Neighborhood Library. It was the first neighborhood library in Washington, D.C., and a Carnegie library. Washington Adventist University (formerly Columbia Union College—1960-2010) is the only graduate university in Takoma Park, and the only graduate institution in Montgomery County, Maryland.

EF International Languages Center Washington, D.C., a private English school for foreign students, is located in Takoma.

See also
 Cady-Lee, a historic home in Takoma
 Takoma (disambiguation)

References

External links

, District of Columbia Public Schools

 
Historic districts on the National Register of Historic Places in Washington, D.C.
Neighborhoods in Northwest (Washington, D.C.)
1883 establishments in Washington, D.C.